Don Carlos Oswaldo Ruspoli y Morenés, Caro y Arteaga, dei Principi Ruspoli (5 August 1932 – 25 October 2016) was a Spanish aristocrat, son of Carlos Ruspoli, 4th Duke of Alcudia and Sueca, and wife Dona María de Belén Morenés y Arteaga, García-Alesson y Echaguë, 18th Countess of Bañares.

He was the 5th Duke of Alcudia Grandee of Spain (formerly First Class) with a Coat of Arms of de Godoy (Letter of 28 November 1958), 5th 
Duke of Sueca Grandee of Spain (Letter of 5 May 1979), 19th Count of Chinchón Grandee of Spain with a Coat of Arms of de Borbón (Boletín Oficial of 3 January 1978 and Letter of 16 October 1978) and Prince of the Holy Roman Empire, Knight of the Sovereign Military Order of Malta and Maestrante of Granada.

Ancestry

References 
 Instituto de Salazar y Castro, Elenco de Grandezas y Titulos Nobiliarios Españoles, Various (periodic publication)

External links 
 
 Carlos Osvaldo Ruspoli y Morenés on a genealogical site

1932 births
2016 deaths
Counts of Chinchón
105
105
Carlos
Italian nobility
Knights of Malta
Grandees of Spain
People from San Sebastián